Practitioner may refer to:

Health practitioner
Justice and public safety practitioner
Legal practitioner
Medical practitioner
Mental health professional or practitioner
Theatre practitioner

Spiritual Practitioner

Solitary practitioner in Wicca and Paganism
Zen practitioner in Buddhism

Other

The Practitioner, a medical journal

See also